Superman Adventures is a DC Comics comic book series featuring Superman. It is set in the continuity (and style) of Superman: The Animated Series. It ran for 66 issues between 1996 and 2002. Writers on the series included Paul Dini, Mark Evanier, Devin Grayson, Scott McCloud, Mark Millar, and Ty Templeton. It is a sister title to The Batman Adventures (based on Batman: The Animated Series) and Justice League Adventures (based on Justice League).

Exclusive characters
While the comic relied mostly on the cast from the animated series, there were a few characters who only appeared in the comic, such as General Zod, Brad Wilson (from Superman III), Bizarro Lois Lane, Krypto, and Sandman (from "The Sandman Saga").

One shots

World's Finest
Batman and Superman Adventures: World's Finest (December 1997) is an adaptation of the 3-part episode of the same name. The adaptation is mostly faithful to the animated version. An additional scene shows Batman discussing with Alfred his problem with Superman (his tendency to rush in without thinking). The story was written by Paul Dini, with penciling by Joe Staton, and inks by Terry Beatty.

Superman vs Lobo
In Superman Adventures Special: Superman vs Lobo: Misery in Space (February 1998), Superman inhales a poison unleashed by some terrorists and leaves Earth to trace a radiation source that should cure him (though not lethal to Superman, the poison makes him a danger to the rest of Earth). Lobo is pointed to an artifact called the Nirvana Crystal, which emits the radiation source Superman requires. The two team up (not with the best of results) and head to the Maracot System.

The owner of the crystal, Squeed, is determined to launch it into the sun to cleanse the universe of evil (as his wife was killed in an accident, but he assumes it to be an evil act). Superman, much to Lobo's dismay, has to destroy the crystal to keep it from going into the sun. The energy from the destruction of the crystal results in Superman's ailment being cured. He leaves to go back to Earth before the council of Maracot can repay him and Lobo with their treasury. Lobo claims he will give Superman his share of the reward and the issue ends with him asking, "Would I lie?" The story was written by David Michelinie, with art by John Delaney and Mike Manley.

Dimension of the Dark Shadows

Reprints

English version by DC Comics

English/Spanish version by Berlitz Publishing
The Learn Spanish with Superman series includes relettered speech bubbles, with over 300 Spanish words and phrases in red replacing the original text. Outside the comic panels frame, the replaced Spanish and the correspoding English texts are printed at the page border, but the English texts do not necessarily matching the ones in original publications. The Aprende Ingles Con Superman versions are in English text.

French version by Urban Comics

Indonesian version by PT Gramedia Majalah

Spanish version by Grupo Editorial Vid

See also
 List of DC Comics publications
 The Batman Adventures
 Adventures in the DC Universe/Justice League Adventures/Justice League Unlimited

Notes

References

External links
 Superman Adventures comic book guide

Adventures
Works based on the DC Animated Universe
Superman titles
Comics based on television series
Comics by David Michelinie
Comics by Mark Millar
Comics by Paul Dini